Pascaline Louvrier (born 28 September 1971) is a French swimmer. She competed in three events at the 1988 Summer Olympics.

References

External links
 

1971 births
Living people
French female breaststroke swimmers
Olympic swimmers of France
Swimmers at the 1988 Summer Olympics
People from Charleville-Mézières
Sportspeople from Ardennes (department)